Xestolabus is a genus of leaf-rolling weevils in the beetle family Attelabidae. There are at least 30 described species in Xestolabus.

Species
These 30 species belong to the genus Xestolabus:

 Xestolabus angustifrons Voss, 1925
 Xestolabus biplagiatus Voss, 1951
 Xestolabus brevicollis Voss, 1925
 Xestolabus brunnescens Voss, 1925
 Xestolabus brunneus Voss, 1925
 Xestolabus cearensis Voss, 1951
 Xestolabus centomyrciae Voss, 1925
 Xestolabus chalceus Voss, 1957
 Xestolabus clinolaboides Voss, 1938
 Xestolabus conicollis Voss, 1925
 Xestolabus constrictipennis (Chittenden, 1926)
 Xestolabus corvinus Voss, 1925
 Xestolabus fulvitarsis Voss, 1925
 Xestolabus heterocerus Voss, 1925
 Xestolabus jatahyensis Voss, 1925
 Xestolabus laesicollis Voss, 1925
 Xestolabus lepidus Voss, 1930
 Xestolabus longiclava Voss, 1925
 Xestolabus melanopygus Voss, 1925
 Xestolabus mutabilis Voss, 1925
 Xestolabus nitidus Voss, 1925
 Xestolabus piceovirens Voss, 1925
 Xestolabus rubellus Voss, 1925
 Xestolabus schirmi Voss, 1953
 Xestolabus sedatus Voss, 1925
 Xestolabus tabaci Voss, 1925
 Xestolabus tabascoensis Voss, 1925
 Xestolabus troglodytes Voss, 1925
 Xestolabus venezolensis Janczyk, 1960
 Xestolabus violaceus Voss, 1925

References

Further reading

 
 

Attelabidae
Articles created by Qbugbot